Edwin May (1823 - 1880) was an American architect based in Indianapolis, Indiana. He designed several county courthouses, the Indiana State House and other public hospital and school buildings, including the Horace Mann Public School No. 13. He also received patents for his fireproofing designs. During the construction of his final project, the Indiana State House, he became paralyzed, traveled to Jacksonville, Florida to recover and died. Adolph Scherrer took over the project.

He was born in Boston, Massachusetts. Louis Henry Gibson worked as a draftsman in his office.

References

1823 births
1880 deaths
Architects from Indianapolis
Architects from Boston
19th-century American architects